Güzel İstanbul (Beautiful Istanbul) is a public sculpture by Gürdal Duyar currently installed in Yıldız Park in Istanbul. Originally located at Karaköy Square, the concrete sculpture of a nude female figure was toppled and partially destroyed on 18 March 1974.

Commissioned in 1973, it was one of the 20 sculptures installed in Istanbul as part of an initiative by the Istanbul Municipality to celebrate the 50th anniversary of the Turkish Republic. Meant to represent Istanbul as a nude female figure, the sculpture was adorned with figurative motifs on its plinth referencing the long-standing history of the city previously known as Constantinople. Although the nude had long served as one of the most common motifs in Western art, several Turkish media outlets along with traditional conservative politicians considered the sculpture obscene and called for its swift removal.

The subsequent controversy surrounding the sculpture's installation in March 1974, commonly referred to as the Güzel İstanbul Affair (Güzel İstanbul Olayı), became so pronounced that it temporarily strained Turkey's governing coalition. Following nine days of intense public debate, fueled by conservative and liberal politicians as well as the media, the sculpture was removed from its plinth and toppled on 18 March. Abandoned and significantly damaged, it remained in Karaköy Square for over a month. On 2 May, Güzel İstanbul was moved to the Yıldız Park, where it was re-erected on a makeshift plinth. As of 2023, the sculpture remains in Yıldız Park and no conservation efforts have been undertaken to return the work to its original condition.

Commission 
In 1972 the Istanbul governor's office formed a Board for the Celebration of the 50th Anniversary of the Republic, in preparation of the 50th Anniversary, which was coming in the following year. A joint initiative of the Istanbul Metropolitan Municipality, the Istanbul Fine Arts Academy and the State College of Fine and Applied Arts formed the Fine Arts Committee of this Board. This committee, which included Şadi Çalık, Mustafa Aslıer and Hüseyin Gezer, decided to commission 50 sculptures to celebrate the 50 years of the Republic, to be sculpted by 50 artists and placed in several public spaces around Istanbul including parks and squares.

Due to insufficient funding, the number of sculptures was reduced to 20. In order to eliminate 30, the Board introduced more stringent qualifications: the sculptor had to be living in Istanbul and either to have received a state award or to have had established their personality in the arts sphere. In addition to Duyar, remaining artists included Kuzgun Acar, Tamer Başoğlu, Zerrin Bölükbaşı, Ali Teoman Germaner, Yavuz Görey, Zühtü Müritoğlu, Füsun Onur, Kamil Sonad, Nusret Suman, and Seyhun Topuz, among others.

The committee did not provide specific stylistic or thematic guidelines, opting for diversity and suggesting that each artist were to submit a work in their idiosyncratic style to represent the diversity of contemporary Turkish sculpture. Additionally, each sculptor was told that the placement of their proposed sculpture would be not be predetermined, though limited to a park, a square, or by a road throughout Istanbul. The design proposals were to be submitted to the State Art and Sculpture Museum on 20 August 1973.

Gürdal Duyar submitted the sketches for his proposal: a nude which he named Güzel Istanbul. His proposal was approved during a meeting of the board that had provincial and municipal representatives in attendance. The board selected his proposal, to be placed on Karaköy Square. The design (and thus also the nudity) was not an issue at any point during this process.

Design
The word  translates to "beautiful" in Turkish and the sculpture has alternatively been called  meaning "Oh Beautiful Istanbul." Duyar's concept was to create an allegory of Istanbul through a nude female figure whose arms would be bound by a chain, representing the defensive chain constructed by the Byzantine Empire forces to close off the Golden Horn from the Ottoman fleet in 1453. In portraying the woman as attempting to break the chains, Duyar had intended to represent the Ottoman conquest of Constantinople which would be later renamed Istanbul. Duyar said that he had identified Istanbul, the artist's hometown, with the natural beauty of the female body.

In Duyar's final design, the female figure is seen leaning slightly backwards, with her arms wrapped behind her. Her head is thrown back and she looks up into the sky. The hands are shackled with a chain, which is not visible from the front. The upper part of the sculpture rests on a plinth, decorated with reliefs depicting pomegranates, figs, honeysuckle and a bee. According to Duyar, the pomegranates in the relief represent Istanbul's many legends, figs its divinity, honeysuckle its air, and the bee its population density, dynamism and abundance. In addition to its historical and political symbolism, Duyar's work has also been interpreted as a universal representation of the emancipation of women.

Erection and removal 
On 10 March 1974, Güzel İstanbul was erected on Istanbul's Karaköy Square, a crowded and open space near the northern end of the Galata Bridge. It garnered particular attention, leading to a campaign against it. Ahu Antmen has suggested this was due to its placement in a space so open and crowded, while Onat Kutlar has suggested that this was due to the sensuality or realism present in Duyar's sculptures including Güzel İstanbul.

Güzel İstanbul Affair 
Other nude sculptures had previously been installed in public areas of Istanbul, and around this time there were also plenty of nude sculptures on display in the İstanbul State Art and Sculpture Museum. None of these had been found indecent or objectionable or caused any controversy. It has been suggested that the officials involved in the various stages of Duyar's commission had not anticipated that the nudeness of the sculpture would cause such controversy. Nonetheless, the installation of Duyar's sculpture was met with immediate backlash and calls for removal by some politicians due to its perceived indecency, particularly by members of the National Salvation Party, traditional-conservatives which were part of the recently formed coalition government. The ensuing controversy and public debate, precipitated by major media outlets and fueled by prominent Turkish political figures, has been referred to the Güzel İstanbul Affair.

An anti-Güzel İstanbul campaign took shape in the media: ten days of press that described the sculpture as indecent and erotic. The newspaper Sabah in particular presented strong opinions, such as a 21 March 1974 front page article that described the sculpture as corrupting the morals of Muslim Turks. This led to the sculpture appearing on the government's agenda: 
Deputy-Prime Minister Necmettin Erbakan stated that the sculpture was immoral, and on 17 March suggested its removal. 
The Minister of the Interior, Oğuzhan Asiltürk, said that the sculpture ought to be removed because it represented Turkish mothers disgracefully.
The mayor of Istanbul, Ahmet İsvan, stated that he disliked the sculpture because he found it tasteless, not because it was nude.
The Governor of Istanbul, Namık Kemal Şentürk, stated that he was unable to judge the sculpture on an artistic level, but that the choice of location had been wrong, and thus he had had the sculpture removed.

The sculpture and its right to remain were defended by republican intellectuals and others, leading to an intense debate of opposing views. Seyhun Topuz, a sculptor who also participated in the 50th Anniversary sculptures, and others, have said that Güzel İstanbul almost ended the nation's governing coalition, then less than two months old. The CHP (Republican People's Party), the other party in the coalition, ended up supporting the MSP (National Salvation Party) position that the sculpture was indecent so as not to risk potential political friction. In doing so, the CHP has been described as having taken a position that went against their own views and ethical values. Among those who defended the sculpture's right to stay was the scholar Hüseyin Gezer who stated that there is a "difference between a naked woman and a nude sculpture".

Removal and public backlash 
On the night of 18 March 1974, Güzel İstanbul was removed from Yıldız Park, only nine days after its erection. A midnight "sledgehammer operation" resulted in the sculpture being broken off its plinth and damaged: its arm was broken off and its plinth motifs destroyed. It was removed from the park and placed on a pile of sand near the Kumkapı municipal construction aggregate site. The front page of Milliyet showed a photo of people posing on top of the empty plinth on the night that the sculpture was removed, as well as the result of the destruction of the plinth by showing the rubble that was left of it. An article in the newspaper Sabah stated that the goal of their campaign to have the sculpture removed had been accomplished, and claimed that the paper was the voice of the people concerning the matter. This was countered by articles in the newspapers Milliyet and Cumhuriyet which described the sculpture's right to remain as a necessity for democracy.

Certain Turkish intellectuals reacted to the events. Burhan Felek criticized the removal by saying that a sculpture shouldn't be removed just because a minister does not like it, and that there isn't a referendum of beliefs for every issue. Melih Cevdet Anday criticized the government for choosing what the people should and should not like. Hıfzı Veldet Velidedeoğlu stated that dominance of the mentality that puts forward religious conservative traditions in the context of fine arts would regress Turkey to a desert of bigotry. Also among those that defended Güzel İstanbul were cartoonists/caricaturists such as Erdoğan Bozok, Altan Erbulak, Nejat Uygur, Yalçın Çetin, Ferruh Doğan, and Nehar Tüblek, who published cartoons commenting on its removal. One of the cartoons represented those that would remove the sculpture as backwards and outdated, another criticized the politicization of art, another criticized the censorious mindset, and others asked why fake issues were being fabricated in the news.

Cartoonists and artists against the removal had an idea of "censoring" all the sculptures in Istanbul by covering them in black cloths in protest, but they called this off. Later, 25 artists joined a nude sculpture exhibition organized by the Sculptors Association in protest at the removal of Güzel İstanbul. The removal from Karaköy Square was seen as an infringement of the freedom of expression in art; and in protest, the Association of Turkish Sculptors organized an exhibition around the theme of nudity to show that the creative will of artists would not be inhibited. Many sculptors participated in the show, including Füsun Onur, who made an assemblage titled Nü (Nude).

The debate about the sculpture spread beyond Istanbul, with Manisa and Zonguldak provinces offering to have Güzel İstanbul erected in their cities. It would also not be the only one of the 20 sculptures to be disturbed or otherwise meet an untimely end: many of the other sculptures were later left in disrepair, intentionally broken or moved.

Charges 
On 20 March 1974, the Istanbul Public Prosecutors Office, considering the articles published about the sculpture in newspapers as charges, opened an inquiry into whether or not the sculpture was obscene. According to a news report, if it was found that the sculpture was indeed obscene, then the 50th Anniversary Committee would face a lawsuit under articles 426 and 576 of Turkish Law. In a 2010 publication, Mustafa Aslıer reflected on the events that had led to the removal of Güzel İstanbul: he had been personally implicated as a member of the 50th anniversary celebrations board in the statements and publications by the press and the MSP that had led to the charges.

Move to new location 
On 3 May 1974, through the quite intervention of Bülent Ecevit, Güzel İstanbul was brought to the Yıldız Park and left lying on its side underneath one of the trees. The move effectively ended the heated political and public debate regarding the sculpture which had lasted almost two months, although Güzel İstanbul was left in an allegedly poor physical condition. In the subsequent months, following images that appeared of the sculpture laying on its side in the park, several newspapers published opinion articles describing how the sculpture being left in this state, as well as why the entire process was disrespectful to the artwork and the artist, including articles by Burhan Felek and Bedi Faik. It was eventually stood upright onto a new makeshift plinth (without the motifs, all of which had been destroyed during the removal from Karaköy Square). , the sculpture remains is in an inconspicuous corner, near the park's Ortaköy entrance. According to some press accounts, it has not being well maintained or looked after, with parts of its concrete crumbling off and exposing its inner structure.

Later events 
Gürdal Duyar, the sculptor of Güzel Istanbul, said little about its fate and had not participated in the controversy. In 1995 he was interviewed by the Turkish journalisy Nebil Özgentürk who asked Duyar about the repeated removals of the artist's work. He replied that his role as the artist was limited to creation of the sculptures, adding "Our job is making sculptures; removing, breaking or changing their location is a different area of expertise."

In 2017, the Istanbul Municipality obscured the sculpture by surrounding it with a fence made of saplings, following alleged complaints by parents about its visibility from a nearby playground. After the news of this physical censorship spread, a campaign on social media criticizing the censorship succeeded in having the structures removed.

References

Notes

Citations

Bibliography

External links 
Güzel İstanbul documentary Hiç Bilmiyordum, Season 2. Episode 8. 
Güzel İstanbul, Beşiktaş Kültür Sanat – via Beşiktaş Municipality

1974 sculptures
Nude sculptures
Concrete sculptures
Sculptures of women in Turkey
Monuments and memorials in Istanbul
Outdoor sculptures in Turkey
Sculptures by Gürdal Duyar